Dawoodi, also known as Domaakí, Dumaki or Domaá, is an endangered Indo-Aryan language spoken by a few hundred people living in the Gilgit-Baltistan territory in northern Pakistan. It is historically related to the Central Indo-Aryan languages of the Indian Midlands, though it has been significantly influenced by its neighbours.

The speakers of the language belong to a small ethnic minority that lives dispersed among the larger regional groups. The majority of Doma communities have in the past switched to the dominant Shina language, with their original language surviving only in the Burushaski areas of Nagar and Hunza. There is a distinct dialect in each of those two areas; they are still mutually intelligible despite numerous differences.

According to local traditions, the Dooma's ancestors came somewhere from the south; according to the speakers themselves their forbearers arrived in the Nager and Hunza Valleys from Kashmir, and north Punjab in separate groups and over an extended period of time via Baltistan, Gilgit, Darel, Tangir, Punial and even Kashghar.

All Dawoodi speakers are proficient in the languages of their host communities (Burushaski and/or Shina) as well as in their own mother tongue. Many of them also know Urdu, which they have learned at school or picked up while working in other parts of Pakistan.

The name Domaki is perceived as pejorative by the speakers, who nowadays prefer the term Dawoodi, which is associated with the Islamic figure of Dawood.

References

Bibliography
 Backstrom, Peter C. Languages of Northern Areas (Sociolinguistic Survey of Northern Pakistan, 2), 1992. 417 pp. .
 
 Lorimer, D. L. R. 1939. The Dumaki Language: Outlines of the Speech of the Doma, or Bericho, of Hunza, Dekker & Van De Vegt, 244 pp.
 
 Weinreich, Matthias. 2010. Language Shift in Northern Pakistan: The Case of Domaakí and Pashto. Iran and the Caucasus 14: 43-56.

Indo-Aryan languages
Languages of Gilgit-Baltistan